Manchi Donga is a 1988 Telugu-language film directed by K. Raghavendra Rao. The film stars Chiranjeevi, Vijayashanti and Suhasini.

Plot
Manchi Donga has Chiranjeevi as Veerendra, who is liked by one and all. Even though he is a thief, Veerendra follows certain principles. Suryam and Chandram are a father and son who are involved in an illegal occupation. Madhavi (Suhasini) who is a lawyer, meets Veerendra and she is attracted towards him for his kindheartedness towards poor people. Vijaya (Vijayasanthi), a friend of Madhavi enters the city as a police inspector. She warns Veerendra for his activities, but Madhavi supports him. Once Veerendra steals a piece of evidence from Gannayya, (also a corrupt person), which has all the details of the activities of Suryam and Chandram. He hands it over to inspector Vijaya. She is very much impressed with his deed and now develops a soft corner for him. After a couple of songs, Veerendra decides to marry Vijaya, while Madhavi sacrifices her silent love for her friend. Veerendra surrenders to the police and is sent to jail. He studies in jail and becomes a police inspector. After his release, he deals with anti-social elements with an iron hand and also gets the Sword of Honour for his efforts.

Cast
 Chiranjeevi as Veerendra
 Vijayashanti as Vijaya
 Suhasini as Madhavi
 Rao Gopal Rao
 Mohan Babu
 Jaggayya
 Kaikala Satyanarayana
 Nirmalamma

Soundtrack 
The soundtrack was composed by K. Chakravarthy.

References

External links

1988 films
Films scored by K. Chakravarthy
Films directed by K. Raghavendra Rao
1980s Telugu-language films